St. JOHN is an English restaurant on St John Street in Smithfield, London. It was opened in October 1994 by Trevor Gulliver, Fergus Henderson, and Jon Spiteri on the premises of a former bacon smoke-house. Under Henderson's guidance as head chef, St. JOHN has specialised in "nose to tail eating", with a devotion to offal and other cuts of meat rarely seen in restaurants, often reclaiming traditional British recipes. Typical dishes include pigs' ears, ducks' hearts, trotters, pigs' tails, bone marrow and, when in season, squirrel. As a result, St. JOHN has developed a following amongst gastronomic circles: "chefs, foodies, food writers and cooks on sabbatical".

Awards and accolades
St. JOHN has won numerous awards and accolades, including Best British and Best overall London Restaurant at the 2001 Moet & Chandon Restaurant Awards. It has also been consistently placed in Restaurant magazine's annual list of the Top 50 restaurants in the world. In 2011, it was placed 41st, up from 43rd in the 2010 rankings. It was awarded a Michelin star in 2009. St. JOHN Hotel was awarded a Michelin star in September 2012.

Related enterprises
The original restaurant in Smithfield was joined by a smaller, less formal sister restaurant and bakery in the Spitalfields area of London called St. JOHN Bread and Wine in 2003, and a hotel near Leicester Square in 2011. As of 2013, the hotel is no longer affiliated with St. JOHN restaurants.

References

External links
St. JOHN restaurant

St John
Buildings and structures in the London Borough of Islington
Michelin Guide starred restaurants in the United Kingdom
Restaurants established in 1994
Tourist attractions in the London Borough of Islington
Smithfield, London
1994 establishments in England